George Earhart House, also known as the Arrington House and Miller House, is a historic home located at New Ellett, Montgomery County, Virginia.  It was built about 1840, and is a two-story,  brick structure with a one-story rear ell.  It has shouldered brick chimneys at three locations.  It has a two-room plan.

It was listed on the National Register of Historic Places in 1989.

References

Houses on the National Register of Historic Places in Virginia
Houses completed in 1840
Houses in Montgomery County, Virginia
National Register of Historic Places in Montgomery County, Virginia